Labeobarbus iturii is a species of ray-finned fish in the genus Labeobarbus which is found only in the Ituri River in The Democratic Republic of the Congo.

References 

 

iturii
Fish described in 1929
Endemic fauna of the Democratic Republic of the Congo